Untermühlhausen is a village in the district of Landsberg in Bavaria, Germany. It is part of the municipality of Penzing.

References

Landsberg (district)